Massa di Somma is a comune (municipality) in the Metropolitan City of Naples in the Italian region Campania, located about  east of Naples.

Massa di Somma borders the following municipalities: Cercola, Ercolano, Pollena Trocchia, San Sebastiano al Vesuvio.

References

Cities and towns in Campania